Oddvard Nilsen (born 24 June 1940, in Bergen) is a Norwegian politician for the Conservative Party.

He was elected to the Norwegian Parliament from Hordaland in 1993 and was re-elected on two occasions.

Nilsen was a member of the executive committee of Askøy municipality council from 1983 to 1989, and then served as mayor from 1989 to 1993.

References

1940 births
Living people
People from Askøy
Conservative Party (Norway) politicians
Members of the Storting
Mayors of Askøy
21st-century Norwegian politicians
20th-century Norwegian politicians